"U&I" is a song recorded in two languages (Korean and Japanese) by South Korean singer Ailee. The Korean version was released as the lead single for her second extended play A's Doll House, via YMC Entertainment on July 12, 2013. In Japan, "U&I" was released as a standalone CD single on March 19, 2014, via Warner Music Japan. 

The song experienced commercial success in South Korea, peaking at number one for two consecutive weeks on both the Gaon Digital Chart and K-pop Hot 100. It underperformed in Japan, however, peaking at number 110 on the Oricon Singles Chart.

Background and release
"U&I" was released digitally via YMC Entertainment on July 12, 2013, in conjunction with Ailee's second extended play A's Doll House, serving as its lead single. In Japan, "U&I" was released as the singer's second Japanese single via Warner Music Japan on March 19, 2014. It was physically distributed in multiple versions: a regular edition CD single, a special edition CD, and a limited edition CD + DVD bundle. 

Prior to the single's release in the country, "U&I" was selected as the official theme song for several fashion events, including 2014 S/S 'Kobe Collection' and 'Tokyo Girls Collection'.

Accolades

Track listing

Japanese CD single
CD 1
 "U&I" (Japanese ver.) – 3:18
 "Ladies Night – 4:10
 "U&I" (Backing Track) – 3:18
 "Ladies Night" (Backing Track) – 4:06

CD 2 – Special Edition Only
 "Heaven" – 3:31
 "I Will Show You" – 3:52
 "Evening Sky" – 3:53
 "Storm" (feat. Verbal Jint) – 3:30
 "U&I" – 3:14
 "No No No" – 3:19
 "Rainy Day" – 3:42
 "Singing Got Better – 3:19

DVD tracklist
Ailee Japan Showcase Live @Shibuya O-East
 "Heaven"
 "I Will Show You"
 "U&I"
 "Heaven" (Japanese ver.)

Japan Original Music Video Collection
 "Heaven"
 "I Will Show You"
 "U&I"
 "Singing Got Better"

Charts

Weekly charts

Monthly charts

Year-end charts

Release history

References

2013 singles
2013 songs
K-pop songs
Gaon Digital Chart number-one singles
Billboard Korea K-Pop number-one singles